Wenyon is a surname. Notable people with the surname include:

 Herbert Wenyon (1888–1944), English cricket player
 Charles Morley Wenyon (1878–1948), English protozoologist

See also
 Kenyon
 Wenyon & Gamble, the name used by the art team of Susan Gamble and Michael Wenyon